Dudu, was a 22nd-century BC king of the Akkadian Empire, who reigned for 21 years according to the Sumerian king list.

He is depicted as becoming king during the time of relative anarchy that had followed the death of Shar-Kali-Sharri. The king list mentions four other figures who had been competing for the throne during a three-year period after Sharkalisharri's death. There are no other surviving records referencing any of these competitors, but a few artifacts with inscriptions confirming Dudu's rule over an Akkadian rump state that may have included little more than the capital, Akkad itself. His inscriptions present him simply as "King of Akkad":

He also seems to have campaigned against former Akkadian subjects to the south, including Girsu, Umma and Elam. Dudu is said to have campaigned against Umma (vicinity of Girsu). One inscription relates directly to his destruction of Girsu:

Dudu may also have campaigned against Elam, but this depends on a dubious interpretation of one of his year names. Unlike preceding Akkadian kings, there are no certain "year names" known from this time, thus it is unlikely that Dudu could have actually reigned so long. 

An alabaster vase in the Louvre Museum, since the year 2000, has the following inscription:

The inroads of the Gutians seem to have caused a fairly rapid collapse of Akkadian power during this period of instability, and it has even been suggested that one of the four named rivals for the throne, Ilulu, was himself a Gutian ruler. After this period, it seems Agade became much less important.

Dudu was succeeded by his son Shu-turul per the king list, who became the last known king of the Akkadian Empire.

Sources 

22nd-century BC kings of Akkad
Sumerian kings
Akkadian kings